Confresa Airport  is the airport serving Confresa, Brazil.

Though privately owned and operated by Frenova Agropecuária Ltda, the facility is open for public use.

History
The airport was commissioned in 2005.

Airlines and destinations

No scheduled flights operate at this airport.

Access

See also

List of airports in Brazil

References

External links

Airports in Mato Grosso
Airports established in 2005
2005 establishments in Brazil